Sir Sidney Horatio Marshall (17 July 1882 – 28 March 1973) was a British businessman and politician. He was Conservative Party Member of Parliament (MP) for  Sutton and Cheam from 1945 to 1954.

References

External links 
 

1882 births
1973 deaths
UK MPs 1945–1950
UK MPs 1950–1951
UK MPs 1951–1955
Knights Bachelor
Conservative Party (UK) MPs for English constituencies